Robert Melville or Melvill may refer to:

 Robert Melvill or Melville (1723–1809), Scottish general, botanist and inventor
 Robert Melville, 1st Lord Melville (died 1621), Scottish lawyer and diplomat
 Robert Melville, 2nd Lord Melville (died 1635)
 Robert Melville (died 1693), burgh commissioner for Cupar (Parliament of Scotland constituency)
 Robert Melville (art critic) (1905–1986), British art critic and journalist
 Robert Melville (Australian politician) (1919–1982), Australian politician
 Robert Melville (car designer), chief designer at McLaren Automotive